Rhodnius pallescens is a species of insect from the genus Rhodnius. The species was originally described by H.G. Barber in 1932.

References

Reduviidae